Selwyn George "Mick" Bremner (born 2 August 1930) is a former New Zealand rugby union player. He was a member of the New Zealand national side, the All Blacks, in 1952, 1956 and 1960. In 1952, he appeared in a single international, the second test against the touring Australians. Four years later, he made another test appearance, in the second-test loss to the touring Springboks. Bremner's third stint in the All Blacks was as a member of the touring party for the 1960 tour of Australia and South Africa. On that tour, he played 16 games, including six as captain, but did not appear in any of the test matches. He did not score any points in his 18 matches for the All Blacks.

Bremner went on to serve a term as president of the Wellington Rugby Football Union.

References

1930 births
Living people
People from Ōtorohanga
People educated at Mount Albert Grammar School
New Zealand rugby union players
New Zealand international rugby union players
Auckland rugby union players
Wellington rugby union players
Manawatu rugby union players
Canterbury rugby union players
Rugby union fly-halves
Rugby union centres
New Zealand sports executives and administrators
Rugby union players from Waikato